Manifest is an American supernatural drama television series created by Jeff Rake that premiered on September 24, 2018, on NBC. It centers on the passengers and crew of a commercial airliner who suddenly reappear after being presumed dead for five and a half years. It stars Melissa Roxburgh, Josh Dallas, Athena Karkanis, J.R. Ramirez, Luna Blaise, Jack Messina, Parveen Kaur, Matt Long, Holly Taylor, Daryl Edwards, and Ty Doran.

In October 2018, NBC ordered further episodes for the first season and subsequently renewed the series for a second season that aired in 2020, and again for a third in 2021. In June 2021, the series was canceled by NBC after three seasons. The series was added to Netflix shortly before it was canceled and immediately topped the viewing charts, persuading Netflix to renew Manifest for a fourth and final season consisting of twenty episodes, with part one premiering on November 4, 2022.

Plot
While traveling from Jamaica to New York City, Montego Air Flight 828 experiences a brief period of severe turbulence. When they land at Stewart International Airport in Newburgh, New York, the plane's 191 passengers and crew learn from NSA deputy director Robert Vance that over five and a half years have passed while they were in the air, during which time they were presumed dead. As they rejoin society, the passengers begin to face the fact that their lives—and loved ones—are not the same as they were, while they also begin to experience guiding voices and visions representing events yet to occur, referred to as 'callings.'

Cast and characters

Main

 Melissa Roxburgh as Michaela "Mick" Stone, a detective who works at the NYPD's 129th Precinct, and Ben's sister. She was a passenger on Flight 828. She later marries Zeke. Ariana Jalia portrays a younger Michaela. 
 Josh Dallas as Ben Stone, a college associate professor in mathematics and Michaela's brother. He was a passenger on Flight 828.
 Athena Karkanis as Grace Stone (seasons 1–3; guest season 4), Ben's wife and Michaela's sister-in-law who runs a catering business.
 J.R. Ramirez as Jared Vasquez, a detective at the NYPD's 129th Precinct and Michaela's ex-fiancé; he married Michaela's best friend, but they divorce after her return. Jared is later promoted to police lieutenant.
 Luna Blaise as Olive Stone, Ben and Grace's daughter, Michaela's niece, Cal's twin sister, and Eden's older sister. Jenna Kurmemaj portrays a young Olive.
 Jack Messina (seasons 1–3; guest season 4) and Ty Doran (season 4; guest season 3) as Cal Stone, Ben and Grace's son, Michaela's nephew, Eden's older brother, and Olive's twin brother, who is five and a half years younger than her after Flight 828 returns. Cal was a passenger on Flight 828. Jack Messina portrays a younger Cal while Ty Doran portrays a teenage Cal.
 Parveen Kaur as Saanvi Bahl, a doctor and medical researcher at Koch Hospital and passenger on Flight 828. She is later recruited to work for the NSA's Project Eureka task force that is investigating 828.
 Matt Long as Zeke Landon (seasons 2–4; recurring season 1), a hiker who got trapped in a cave during a blizzard and was presumed dead for a year. He returns to life in a situation similar to what happened to Flight 828 passengers. He later marries Michaela and becomes the first person to beat his death date after saving Cal's life. After beating his death date, Zeke develops empathic powers. At the end of the first part of season 4, Zeke sacrifices himself to save Cal by absorbing Cal's returned cancer. Colin Critchley portrays a younger Zeke.
 Holly Taylor as Angelina Meyer (seasons 3–4), a Flight 828 passenger who is held captive by her religiously fanatic parents in Costa Rica after her return. She is later rescued by Michaela and Zeke and taken in by the Stones to live with them.
 Daryl Edwards as Robert Vance (season 4; recurring seasons 1–3), the director of the NSA who leads the investigation of the re-emergence of Montego Air Flight 828. Despite apparently being killed in season 1 during the raid on a Singularity Project's base, he is revealed to still be alive in season 2. With only a few people aware he is alive, Vance begins working covertly to uncover the mysteries of Flight 828 and his government's sinister objectives. After his survival is revealed to the government in season 3, Vance resumes his old position and heads up a new taskforce known as Project Eureka, examining the rebuilt wreckage of the plane for clues.

Recurring

 Frank Deal as Bill Daly (seasons 1, 3-4), the pilot of Flight 828. After vanishing in season 1, he abruptly reappears for a moment in Flight 828's cockpit after the tail fin is returned to the ocean.
 Alfredo Narciso as Captain Riojas (season 1), the police captain of the NYPD's 129th Precinct where Michaela and Jared work.
 Mugga as Bethany Collins, a flight attendant on Flight 828 and Georgia's wife.
 Julienne Hanzelka Kim as Kelly Taylor (seasons 1, 3), a passenger on Flight 828. After the twenty people who watch as the Flight 828 aircraft explodes are warned not to discuss what they know with anyone, Kelly goes on national media to express what she believes. While she is watching herself on television later, she is shot in the head by an unknown person.
 Malachy Cleary as Steve Stone (season 1–2, 4), Michaela and Ben's father and Cal, Olive, and Eden's grandfather.
 Geraldine Leer as Karen Stone (season 1–2), Michaela and Ben's mother and Cal, Olive, and Eden's grandmother. She dies while Flight 828 is missing. Her favorite Bible verse is Romans 8:28, which includes "all things work together for good." The verse is often repeated by the Stones when they discuss the callings.
 Omar Torres II as Tony Diaz, a police officer in the NYPD's 129th Precinct.
 Victoria Cartagena as Lourdes (season 1), Michaela's former best friend who married Jared after Michaela's disappearance. After learning of Michaela and Jared's brief affair, she divorces Jared.
 Tim Moriarty as Tim Powell (seasons 1, 3), the deputy director of the NSA.
 Olli Haaskivi as Isaiah (season 1–2), a passionate but fragile member of the Church of the Returned. He starts a fire at a nightclub to show others that the Flight 828 passengers are miracles, but dies in the act.
 Adriane Lenox as Beverly, Evie's mother. After the accident which killed her daughter, she blames Michaela for what happened. Beverly later develops dementia and forgets that Evie is dead, and Glen stops giving her the news and lets her believe Evie is just not home. After the death of her husband, she allows Michaela and Zeke to live with her per Greg's video will as Michaela is reluctant to have her in assisted living. In season 4, she is mentioned to have died as seen in "Go-Around" when Michaela nears her tombstone that is next to Evie's tombstone during a jog.
 Daniel Sunjata as Danny (season 1–2), Grace's boyfriend whom she meets after Ben's disappearance.
 Francesca Faridany as Fiona Clarke (season 1, 4), a scientist on Flight 828 who is involved with Unified Dynamic Systems and the Singularity project.
 Nikolai Tsankov as Marko Valeriev (season 1, 4), a Bulgarian passenger of Flight 828 who is among the foreign nationals in the custody of Unified Dynamic Systems (UDS) and the Singularity project.
 Shirley Rumierk as Autumn Cox (season 1), a Flight 828 passenger who has outstanding arrest warrants due to being a victim of identity theft. She is used by Laurence's superiors to find out what Ben knows about the Singularity project.
 Jared Grimes as Adrian Shannon (season 1-4), a passenger on Flight 828. He is an entrepreneur who forms the Church of the Returned.
 Elizabeth Marvel as Kathryn Fitz / The Major (season 1–2), a woman leading a government entity that is looking to weaponize the "callings" the 828 passengers frequently experience. In "False Horizon", she is identified as US Army Major General Kathryn Fitz, a specialist in psychological warfare with thirty years experience in covert operations. She is later accidentally poisoned by Saanvi. Before dying, Kathryn states that she planned to infect people with the same blood that is in the Flight 828 passengers, in hopes of replicating the mutation. In season 3, Vance is revealed to have covered up her murder and made it look like it was done by an enemy spy in order to protect Saanvi. It is also stated that the government shut down her project upon the Major's death.
 Brandon Schraml as Director Jansen, a representative of The Major. He is tasked with oversight of Autumn Cox.
 Maryann Plunkett as Priscilla Landon (season 1–2), Zeke's mother.
 Ed Herbstman as Troy Davis, a lab tech working with Saanvi to solve the mystery of the 828 passenger mutations. He is drugged and disappears for a while, before resurfacing as a member of the NSA's "Project Eureka" 828 task force, apparently working against his will.
 Andrene Ward-Hammond as Captain Kate Bowers (season 2–3), the police captain of the NYPD's 129th Precinct who succeeds Riojas.
 Brendan Burke as Emmett (season 2–4), Vance's mercenary.
 Ellen Tamaki as Drea Mikami (season 2–4), Michaela's new partner at the NYPD.
 Garrett Wareing as TJ Morrison (seasons 2, 4), a college student and Flight 828 passenger who becomes close with Olive and helps Ben try to solve the mystery of the plane's disappearance and return. He departs for Egypt at the end of the second season to continue his work there, but keeps in touch with the Stones and sends them clues that he finds. In season 4, TJ returns to help the Stones with the mystery of the Omega Sapphire and begins a romantic relationship with Olive.
 Leah Gibson as Tamara (season 2), a bartender who works at a bar that is frequented by the Xers.
 Carl Lundstedt as Billy (season 2), Tamara's brother and an Xer.
 Maury Ginsberg as Simon White (season 2), an elite faculty member of the college that hires Ben who is revealed to be secretly leading the Xers.
 James McMenamin as Jace Baylor (season 2–3), a drug dealer who later kidnaps Cal as part of his revenge on Michaela for busting his drug operation. Along with his brother Pete and Kory Jephers, they are often referred to as the "meth heads". After disappearing under the ice, he re-emerges 84 days later in a situation similar to what happened to Flight 828 passengers. Jace seeks revenge upon Michaela once again, murdering Grace's stepbrother Tarik in the process. Jace's resurrection proves to be part of an ancient test known as the Last Trial which he fails when he refuses to give up vengeance on Michaela, leading to his second demise as he spews out lake water. However, his failure also dooms Pete and Kory who had passed their own parts of the test as they are grabbed by a shadowy figure. Their bodies end up in Project Eureka's custody.
 Devin Harjes as Pete Baylor (season 2–3), the brother of Jace who assists in his drug operation. After disappearing under the ice, he re-emerges 84 days later in a situation similar to what happened to Flight 828 passengers. He forms a romantic relationship with Angelina, but dies once again when his death date arrives after Jace fails the Last Trial when a shadowy figure grabs him which leaves Angelina devastated. Their bodies end up in Project Eureka's custody.
 DazMann Still as Kory Jephers (season 2–3), a bus driver allied with Jace. After disappearing under the ice, he re-emerges 84 days later in a situation similar to what happened to Flight 828 passengers. He dies once again when his death date arrives after Jace fails the Last Trial when a shadowy figure grabs him.
 Lauren Norvelle as Sarah Fitz (season 3), The Major's daughter who begins dating Jared after seeking out the NYPD to investigate her mother's disappearance.
 Warner Miller as Tarik (season 3), Grace's stepbrother who lives somewhere in Upstate New York. He is later stabbed by Jace and dies of his wounds in Grace's arms.
 Will Peltz as Levi (season 3), an archaeologist at the college where Ben works who helps Olive decrypt an ancient parchment connected to the death date.
 Mahira Kakkar as Aria Gupta (season 3-4), a lead scientist of the NSA's "Project Eureka" 828 task force.
 Ali Lopez-Sohaili as Eagan Tehrani (season 3-4), an 828 passenger with a photographic memory who aligns with several 828 passengers in opposition to Ben's leadership.
 Brianna Riccio and Gianna Riccio as Eden Stone (season 4), the daughter of Ben and Grace and younger sister of Cal and Olive.

Episodes

Series overview

Season 1 (2018–19)

Season 2 (2020)

Season 3 (2021)

Season 4 (2022)

Production

Development
On August 23, 2017, NBC gave the production a put pilot commitment. The pilot was written by Jeff Rake, who was also set to serve as executive producer alongside Robert Zemeckis and Jack Rapke. Jackie Levine was expected to serve as a co-executive producer. Production companies involved with the pilot were slated to consist of Compari Entertainment and Warner Bros. Television. In January 2018, NBC gave the production a pilot order and that David Frankel would direct and executive produce the pilot. In May 2018, NBC gave the production a series order of thirteen episodes with a premiere in third quarter of 2018 and a Monday timeslot at 10 p.m. On June 19, 2018, the series premiere was set for September 24, 2018. On October 18, 2018, NBC ordered an additional three episodes of the series, bringing the total up to sixteen episodes.

On April 15, 2019, NBC renewed the series for a second season, which premiered on January 6, 2020. On June 15, 2020, NBC renewed the series for a third season which premiered on April 1, 2021.

Casting

In February 2018, Josh Dallas, Melissa Roxburgh, and J.R. Ramirez joined the pilot's main cast. Athena Karkanis, Parveen Kaur, and Luna Blaise were cast in main roles the following month. In August 2019, Yasha Jackson, Garrett Wareing, Andrene Ward-Hammond, and Ellen Tamaki were cast in recurring roles for the second season. In October 2019, Leah Gibson and Carl Lundstedt had been cast in recurring capacities. On September 22, 2020, Holly Taylor was cast a new series regular for the third season. On October 22, 2020, Will Peltz was cast in a recurring role for the third season.

Cancellation and revival
On June 14, 2021, NBC canceled the series after three seasons. Due to the cliffhanger ending to season 3 and the fact that creator Jeff Rake originally sold Manifest to NBC with a six-season plan mapped out, Rake and others were hopeful that the series would get picked up by another platform. One possibility was Netflix, where the first two seasons of Manifest debuted in the #3 spot and quickly rose to the most watched show on the streaming service. Rake tweeted on June 15: "I am devastated by NBC's decision to cancel us. That we've been shut down in the middle is a gut punch to say the least. Hoping to find a new home. You fans deserve an ending to your story." On June 21, 2021, Warner announced that negotiations with Netflix had broken down and that they would no longer be seeking a new home for the series. The following week, Rake followed-up on the status quo regarding the series' proper conclusion, stating that: "We're trying to find a way to conclude the series. Could take a week, a month, a year. But we're not giving up. You deserve an end to the story."

On June 30, 2021, Entertainment Weekly reported that Rake was now looking for a platform that would bankroll a two-hour Manifest film that would cut to the chase and tie up all the loose ends from the third-season finale. Said Rake, "There is a huge appetite for people wanting to know what's that end of the story, what happened to the passengers, what ultimately happened to that airplane."

The following month, however, it was reported that talks had resumed between Warner Bros. Television and NBC regarding the series' renewal for a potential fourth season, with Netflix also taking part in the renewal discussions. On August 28, 2021, Netflix renewed Manifest for a fourth and final season, consisting of 20 episodes, split across multiple parts. Dallas and Roxburgh were set to return, with additional original cast members in negotiations to return as well. On September 9, 2021, it reported that Kaur, Blaise, Taylor return as series regulars alongside Dallas, Roxburgh, and Ramirez while Karkanis and Messina exited and Ty Doran was promoted to series regular taking over Messina's role as the older Cal. A day later, it was announced that Daryl Edwards has been promoted to series regular. Matt Long, who was initially feared not able to return for the fourth season due to scheduling conflicts, was also later confirmed to be joining the cast for the fourth season. The first part of the fourth season premiered on November 4, 2022.

Release
On July 21, 2018, the series held a panel at San Diego Comic-Con in San Diego, California. Those in attendance included executive producer Jeff Rake and actors Melissa Roxburgh and Josh Dallas. On August 28, 2018, the first nine minutes of the first episode were released among various digital outlets. The series also took part in the 12th Annual PaleyFest Fall Television Previews on September 10, 2018, which featured a preview screening of the series.

Reception

Critical response
The series was met with a mixed response from critics upon its premiere. On the review aggregation website Rotten Tomatoes, the first season holds an approval rating of 56% with an average rating of 6.2/10, based on 39 reviews. The website's critical consensus reads, "Manifests attempts to balance supernatural mystery and melodrama largely work thanks to its well-chosen cast — though it could use a few more distinguishing characteristics." Metacritic, which uses a weighted average, assigned the series a score of 55 out of 100 based on 15 critics, indicating "mixed or average reviews".

In a more positive assessment, USA Todays Kelly Lawler explained how she felt that the series' simplicity and variety of drama subgenres might help it outlast similarly themed but ultimately unsuccessful past shows. She further praised the series for maintaining the standard of quality it set with its premiere episode saying, "Heavily serialized shows, such as Lost, Breaking Bad, or Game of Thrones often start with a great concept and first episode. But many lesser shows collapse when the story expands. Manifest navigated through its first major roadblock by easily moving from the setup to meatier stories." In another favorable evaluation, Varietys Daniel D'Addario commented that the pilot didn't "pretend to have answers; it only poses questions. But its inquisitiveness and willingness to be bold and fairly uncynical given all the things it's trying to be is more than welcome." In a mixed critique, Los Angeles Timess Lorraine Ali remarked that the series had a compelling premise and that the many mysteries it introduced "point toward a potentially addictive series if Manifest allows its gripping supernatural narrative to rise above its characters' less interesting personal dramas."The Washington Posts Hank Stuever compared the series negatively to other network science fiction series saying, "Manifest, alas, beelines thoughtlessly toward its hokiest idea, when some of the returning passengers discover they've acquired psychic powers. Just like that, a viewer who might have been interested in the human element is instead served a cold plate of mystery meat — not the new Lost, but a feeble throwback to forgettable failures such as The Event." In a similarly dismissive appraisal, The New York Times Margaret Lyons commented that "Manifest has a frustrating lack of propulsion, a central dullness whose force field is so strong it bends all the interesting parts toward itself."

Ratings

Season 1
The premiere episode was both the top-rated new show for the broadcast season and the top-rated show airing that week.

Season 2

Season 3

Streaming response
Netflix started streaming Manifest in June 2021 and 25 million accounts in the U.S. and Canada watched the show within its first 28 days of streaming. The series remained in Netflix's Top 10 list for 71 days since its debut and was No. 1 in the U.S. for 19 days. It then went on to break Netflix's streaming record with 6th straight week over 1 billion minutes viewed. By September 2021, Manifest was the third show in Netflix history to sit in its Top 10 list for one hundred days.

Accolades

See also 
 Departure, a TV series about a crashed airliner investigation
 Lost, a TV series about a crashed airliner on a mysterious island
 4400, a TV series about people from various different times in the past who come back to life
 Les Revenants ("The Returned"), a French TV series about people who mysteriously return years after their death without having aged and their attempts to reintegrate into their former lives
 The Returned, an American remake of the French TV series
 Glitch, an Australian TV series about people from various different times in the past who come back to life in a country town

References

External links
 
 

2010s American drama television series
2010s American mystery television series
2010s American supernatural television series
2018 American television series debuts
2020s American drama television series
2020s American mystery television series
2020s American supernatural television series
American television series revived after cancellation
Aviation television series
English-language television shows
English-language Netflix original programming
NBC original programming
Television series by Universal Television
Television series by Warner Bros. Television Studios
Television shows about aviation accidents or incidents